In enzymology, a mRNA (guanine-N7-)-methyltransferase also known as mRNA cap guanine-N7 methyltransferase is an enzyme that catalyzes the chemical reaction

S-adenosyl-L-methionine + G(5')pppR-RNA  S-adenosyl-L-homocysteine + m7G(5')pppR-RNA (mRNA containing an N7-methylguanine cap)

Thus, the two substrates of this enzyme are S-adenosyl methionine and G(5')pppR-RNA, whereas its two products are S-adenosylhomocysteine and m7G(5')pppR-RNA. This enzyme belongs to the family of transferases, specifically those transferring one-carbon group methyltransferases.

In humans, mRNA cap guanine-N7 methyltransferase is encoded by the RNMT gene.

Nomenclature 

The systematic name of this enzyme class is S-adenosyl-L-methionine:mRNA (guanine-N7-)-methyltransferase. Other names in common use include:
 messenger ribonucleate guanine 7-methyltransferase, 
 guanine-7-methyltransferase, 
 messenger RNA guanine 7-methyltransferase, and 
 S-adenosyl-L-methionine:mRNA (guanine-7-N-)-methyltransferase.
 cap MTase

See also
 7-Methylguanosine

References

Further reading 

 
 
 
 

EC 2.1.1
Enzymes of known structure